A tamga or tamgha (from ; ; ;) was an abstract seal or stamp used by Eurasian nomads and by cultures influenced by them. The tamga was normally the emblem of a particular tribe, clan or family. They were common among the Eurasian nomads throughout Classical Antiquity and the Middle Ages. As clan and family identifiers, the collection and systematic comparison of tamgas is regarded to provide insights into relations between families, individuals and ethnic groups in the steppe territory.

Similar tamga-like symbols were sometimes adopted by sedentary peoples adjacent to the Pontic–Caspian steppe both in Eastern Europe and Central Asia.

It has been speculated that Turkic tamgas represent one of the sources of the Old Turkic script of the 6th-10th c., but since the mid-20th c., this hypothesis is widely rejected as being unverifiable.

Tamgas in the steppe tradition

Ancient origins

Tamgas originate in pre-historic times, but their exact usage and development cannot be continuously traced over time. There are, however, symbols represented in rock art that are referred to as tamgas or tamga-like. If they serve to record the presence of individuals at a particular place, they may be functionally equivalent with medieval tamgas.

In the later phases of the Bosporan Kingdom, the ruling dynasty applied personal tamgas, composed of a fragment representing the family and a fragment representing the individual king, apparently in continuation of steppe traditions and in an attempt to consolidate seditary and nomadic factions within the kingdom.

Turkic peoples

According to Clauson (1972, p.504f.), Common Turkic tamga means "originally a `brand' or mark of ownership placed on horses, cattle, and other livestock; it became at a very early date something like a European coat of arms or crest, and as such appears at the head of several Türkü and many O[ld] Kir[giz] funary monuments".

Among modern Turkic peoples, the tamga is a design identifying property or cattle belonging to a specific Turkic clan, usually as a cattle brand or stamp. In Turkestan, it has remained what it originally was: a cattle brand and clan identifier. The Turks who remained pastoral nomad kings in eastern Anatolia and Iran, continued to use their clan tamgas and in fact, they became high-strung nationalistic imagery.  The Aq Qoyunlu and Qara Qoyunlu, like many other royal dynasties in Eurasia, put their tamga on their flags and stamped their coinage with it.

When Turkish clans took over more urban or rural areas, tamgas dropped out of use as pastoral ways of life became forgotten. That is most evident in the Turkish clans that took over western and eastern Anatolia after the Battle of Manzikert. The Turks who took over western Anatolia founded the Sultanate of Rûm and became Roman-style aristocrats. Most of them adopted the then-Muslim symbol of the Seal of Solomon after the Sultanate disintegrated into a mass of feuding ghazi states (see Isfendiyarids, Karamanids). Only the Ottoman ghazi state (later to become the Ottoman Empire) kept its tamga, which was so highly stylized that the bow was stylized down eventually to a crescent moon.

Tamgas of the 21 Oghuz tribes (as Charuklug had none) according to Mahmud al-Kashgari in Dīwān Lughāt al-Turk:

Mongolian
"Tamga," or "tamag'a," literally means "stamp" or "seal" in Mongolian and designates emblematic symbols which were historically used by various Mongolic tribes or clans in Central Asia. According to Clauson (1972, p.504), it was originally a Turkic word also "used for a Chinese `seal' and passed into Mong[olian] in this meaning as tamaga".

In the Mongol Empire, a tamgha was a seal placed on taxed items and, by extension, a tax on commerce (see Eastern Europe below)..

Over a hundred different Mongolian tamga are known. Certain tamga were adopted by individual medieval Mongolic and Turkic rulers, and were consequently used on coins and seals issued by these rulers. Tamga are most widely found on Islamic coins issued by the descendants of Chinggis Khan in the various khanates of Central Asia during the 13th and 14th centuries, in particular the Chaghatai Khanate. Tamga are of immense interest to numismatists, and are discussed in many academic works relating to the medieval Islamic coins of Central Asia. However, numismatists and historians currently have limited options for representing tamga symbols in text, and cannot reliably interchange text including tamga symbols because they are either represented as images, or are handdrawn, or use an ad hoc font. Doctor Nyamaa identifies nearly a hundred tamga signs used on coins, although only about half of them can be assigned to a specific ruler, and some of them are variant forms or presentation forms of the same tamga.

Tamgas are also stamped using hot irons on domesticated animals such as horses in present-day Mongolia and others to identify that the livestock belongs to a certain family, since livestock is allowed to roam during the day. Each family has their own tamga markings for easier identification. Tamga marks are not very elaborate, since they are made from curved pieces of iron by the individual families.    

A tamag'a is also used as the "state seal" of Mongolia, which is handed over by the President of Mongolia as part of the transition to a new president. In the presidential case, the tamag'a is a little more elaborate and is contained in a wooden box.

Caucasus 
From Turkic, the term "tamga" has also been loaned into Caucasian languages, e.g., ; . Among the Circassians, almost every family has a tamga to this day.

Secondary Usage

Eastern Europe

Throughout the early Middle Ages, the Rurikid nobles of the Kievan Rus' used Tamga-like symbols to denote property rights over various items (Rurikid symbols). Very likely, these are of Khazar (Turkic) origin and have been adopted along with the expansion of the Rus into steppe territory. A similar process of acculturation of steppe elements can also be suspected for (or before) the Second Bulgarian Empire (1185–1396), as its flags closely resemble the Rurikid symbols in taking the shape of a trident.
In East Slavic languages, the term tamga (Russian тамга) survived in state institution of border customs, with associated cluster of terms: rastamozhit''' (Russian растаможить, Belarusian растаможыць, pay customs duties), tamozhnya (Russian таможня, customs), tamozhennik (Russian таможенник, customs officer), derived from the use of tamga as a certificate of State. In East Slavic, the steppe term competes with forms assumed to originate from Germanic (Old Church Slavonic мꙑто toll, Russian (historical) мы́то "customs duty", Ukrainian мито "toll, customs duty", and Belarusian  мытня, Ukrainian митниця "customs"; cf. German Maut "street toll" and Medieval Latin mūta "toll").

In the 20th c., the Rurikid trident, colloquially called tryzub (тризуб), has been adopted as national symbol and the coat of arms of Ukraine. The modern version has been designed by Vasyl Krychevsky (1918) and Andriy Grechylo, Oleksii Kokhan, and Ivan Turetskyi (1992).

Islamic empires

In the late medieval  Turco-Mongol states, the term tamga was used for any kind of official stamp or seal. This usage persisted in the early modern Islamic Empires (Ottoman Empire, Mughal Empire), and in some of their modern successor states.

In the Urdu language (which absorbed Turkic vocabulary), Tamgha is used as medal. Tamgha-i-Jurat is the fourth highest Military medal of Pakistan. It is admissible to all ranks for gallantry and distinguished services in combat. Tamgha-i-Imtiaz or Tamgha-e-Imtiaz, which translates as "medal of excellence", is fourth highest honour given by the Government of Pakistan to both the military and civilians. Tamgha-i-Khidmat or Tamgha-e-Khidmat, which translates as "medal of services", is seventh highest honour given by the Government of Pakistan to both the military and civilians. It is admissible to non-commissioned officers and other ranks for long meritorious or distinguished services of a non-operational nature.

In Egypt, the term damgha or tamgha'' is still used in two contexts. One is a tax or fee when dealing with the government. It is normally in the form of stamps that have to be purchased and affixed to government forms, such as a driver license or a registration deed for a contract. The term is derived from the Ottoman damga resmi. Another is a stamp put on every piece of jewelry made from gold or silver to indicate it is genuine, and not made of baser metals.

See also
 House mark
 Mon (emblem)
 Siglas poveiras
 Tughra

References

Further reading
 
 
 
 

Archaeological artefact types
Seals (insignia)
Symbols
Heraldic charges
Turkish words and phrases
Mongolian words and phrases
Turkic culture